Geox-TMC was a Spanish-based road bicycle racing team, registered for 2011 as a UCI Professional Continental team.  Established as Saunier Duval–Prodir in 2004, the team has had success in one-day races such as Clásica de San Sebastián.

The team's final title sponsors were Geox, an Italian shoe company, and TMC, a multinational company that develops electric transformers with cast resin windings.

History
After team cyclist Riccardo Riccò was arrested by police following a positive test for doping after the 4th stage of the 2008 Tour de France, the team left the 2008 Tour de France before the 12th stage of the race began. Both Riccò and Leonardo Piepoli were fired from the team, but the team was still denied a place in the 2008 Vuelta a España and other UCI ProTour races. The team's sponsors withdrew their support, but new sponsors were found to retain the team's participation at the top level of the sport. The team continued through the 2009 and 2010 season sponsored by Fuji–Servetto and then later as Footon–Servetto–Fuji.

For 2011 the team secured new sponsors Geox and TMC. They  entered the 2011 season as a pro continental team after failing to secure a World Tour Licence. They received a wild card invite to the  Vuelta a España which they won with Juan José Cobo, although this result has been reversed by the UCI due to violation of anti-doping rules. On October 20 it was announced that Geox were withdrawing their sponsorship. It was later announced by the UCI that riders were free to move to other teams. On December 7, it was announced that management had failed to find a new sponsor, and would now turn their focus to helping riders find new teams, indicating that the team would not continue.

Major wins

2004
Stage 1 Tour of Qatar, Francisco Ventoso
Overall Vuelta a Andalucía, Juan Carlos Domínguez
Stage 3, Juan Carlos Domínguez
Overall Setmana Catalana de Ciclisme, Joaquim Rodríguez
Stage 3 Vuelta a Aragón, Constantino Zaballa
Stage 4 Tour de Romandie, Fabian Jeker
Stage 5 Vuelta a Asturias, Miguel Ángel Martín Perdiguero
Stages 1 & 2 Euskal Bizikleta, Miguel Ángel Martín Perdiguero
Wachovia USPRO Championships, Francisco Ventoso
Overall Volta a Catalunya, Miguel Ángel Martín Perdiguero
Stages 2, 3 & 4, Miguel Ángel Martín Perdiguero
Clásica San Sebastián, Miguel Ángel Martín Perdiguero
Subida a Urkiola, Leonardo Piepoli
Stage 9 Vuelta a España, Leonardo Piepoli
Stage 19 Vuelta a España, Constantino Zaballa

2005
Stage 4 Volta a Catalunya, Leonardo Piepoli
Stage 5 Volta a Catalunya, Íñigo Cuesta
Stage 6 Tour de Suisse, Chris Horner
 Time Trial Championships, Marco Pinotti
 Road Race Championships, Juan Manuel Gárate
Overall Vuelta a Burgos, Juan Carlos Domínguez
Stage 4, Juan Carlos Domínguez
Clásica de San Sebastián, Constantino Zaballa
Subida a Urkiola, Joaquim Rodríguez
 Mountains classification in the Vuelta a España, Joaquim Rodríguez

2006
Stage 5 Settimana Internazionale di Coppi e Bartali, Riccardo Riccò
Overall Vuelta al Pais Vasco, José Ángel Gómez Marchante
Stage 6, José Ángel Gómez Marchante
Overall Volta a Catalunya, David Cañada
Stages 13 & 17 Giro d'Italia, Leonardo Piepoli
Overall Euskal Bizikleta, Koldo Gil
Stages 1 & 4b, Koldo Gil
Stage 4a, Francisco Ventoso
Stage 6 Tour de Suisse, Koldo Gil
 Time Trial Championship, Piotr Mazur
Stage 3 Vuelta a España, Francisco Ventoso
Stage 14 Vuelta a España, David Millar
Japan Cup, Riccardo Riccò

2007
Stage 4 Tour de San Luis, Riccardo Riccò
Prologue Paris–Nice, David Millar
Stages 3 & 4 Tirreno–Adriatico, Riccardo Riccò
Stages 2, 3 & 5 Vuelta a Castilla y León, Francisco Ventoso
Stage 5 Settimana Internazionale di Coppi e Bartali, Riccardo Riccò
Overall Vuelta al País Vasco, Juan José Cobo
Stages 1 & 5, Juan José Cobo
Subida al Naranco, Koldo Gil
Overall Vuelta a Asturias, Koldo Gil
Stage 3, Alberto Fernández de la Puebla
Stage 10 Giro d'Italia, Leonardo Piepoli
Stage 15 Giro d'Italia, Riccardo Riccò
Stage 17 Giro d'Italia, Gilberto Simoni
Stage 19 Giro d'Italia, Iban Mayo
 Mountains classification Giro d'Italia, Leonardo Piepoli
GP Llodio, David de la Fuente
Stage 1 Euskal Bizikleta, Alberto Fernández de la Puebla
 Time Trial Championships, Raivis Belohvoščiks
 Road Race Championships, David Millar
 Time Trial Championships, David Millar
Subida a Urkiola, José Ángel Gómez Marchante
Stage 5 Eneco Tour, Luciano Pagliarini
Stage 9 Vuelta a España, Leonardo Piepoli
Stage 4 Tour of Missouri, Luciano Pagliarini
Stage 1 Vuelta a Chihuahua, Javier Mejías
Japan Cup, Manuele Mori

2008
Stage 5 Vuelta a Andalucía, Denis Flahaut
Stage 6 Tour of California, Luciano Pagliarini
Stages 2 & 8 Giro d'Italia, Riccardo Riccò
Overall Euskal Bizikleta, Eros Capecchi
Stage 3, Eros Capecchi
 Time Trial Championships, Raivis Belohvoščiks
Stage 10 Tour de France, Juan José Cobo
Stage 5 Vuelta a Burgos, Juan José Cobo
Stage 9 Volta a Portugal, Juan José Cobo
Stage 7 Eneco Tour, Raivis Belohvoščiks
Stage 2 Deutschland Tour, David de la Fuente
Stages 4 & 5 Vuelta Mexico, José Alberto Benítez
Stage 4 Vuelta a Chihuahua, Iker Camaño
Young rider classification in the Giro d'Italia, Riccardo Riccò

Tour de France:
Stage 6: Riccardo Riccò
Stage 9: Riccardo Riccò
Stage 10: Leonardo Piepoli
Tested Positive For MIRCERA – Stripped of stage wins

2009
Stage 4 Vuelta a Castilla y León, Juan José Cobo
GP Miguel Induráin, David de la Fuente
Stage 1 Tour de Romandie, Ricardo Serrano

2010
Stage 2 Tour de San Luis, Rafael Valls
Stage 3 Tour Down Under, Manuel Cardoso
Overall Circuit de Lorraine, Fabio Felline
Stages 2 & 3, Fabio Felline

2011
Clásica de Almería, Matteo Pelucchi
Stage 3 Giro del Trentino, Fabio Duarte
Stage 2a Brixia Tour, Fabio Felline

National champions
2005
  Time Trial Championships, Marco Pinotti
  Road Race Championships, Juan Manuel Gárate
2006
  Time Trial Championship, Piotr Mazur
2007
  Time Trial Championships, Raivis Belohvoščiks
   Road Race Championships, David Millar
  Time Trial Championships, David Millar
2008
  Time Trial Championships, Raivis Belohvoščiks

Supplementary statistics

See also
List of teams and cyclists in the 2008 Tour de France
2008 Tour de France
Tour de France

References

External links 

 

Defunct cycling teams based in Spain
Sports teams in Cantabria
Cycling teams established in 2004
Cycling teams disestablished in 2011
Former UCI WorldTeams
Cycle racing in Cantabria